Parliamentary elections were held in Belarus on 17 October 2004, with a second round of voting in two constituencies on 27 October, and a third round in one on 20 March 2005. The vast majority of successful candidates, 97 of 109, were independents. Voter turnout was reported to be 91.04% in the first round.

A total of 359 candidates contested the election, with oppositing parties claiming that around 40% of their candidates were not registered. The OCSE delegation noted that although all candidates were given a set amount of free television and radio airtime and a free statement in the national press, over 80% of television news time was dedicated to President Alexander Lukashenko in the five weeks before the election. They also noted concerns about the independence of the Electoral Commission and a lack of transparency during the voting and counting process. The government also closed down nine independent newspapers in the lead-up to the elections.

Results

References

Parliamentary elections in Belarus
Belarus
Parliament
Election and referendum articles with incomplete results
Belarus